Witness is a one-act play by Terrence McNally which opened Off-Broadway at the Gramercy Arts Theatre on November 21, 1968, and closed on January 26, 1969.

Production
Witness premiered Off-Broadway at the Gramercy Arts Theatre in 1968. It starred James Coco, Sally Kirkland, Richard Marr, and Joe Ponazecki, and was paired with another McNally play, Sweet Eros.  The production ran through January 26, 1969.

Witness is one of McNally's earlier plays and received mixed reviews.

Overview
The play depicts a man who is planning to assassinate the President of the United States from the window of a building, all the while keeping a gagged and bound victim as a witness to his sanity. One of the play's major themes is loneliness.

References

Further reading
 Terrence McNally : 15 short plays, Terrence McNally, Smith and Kraus, Lyme, NH, c1994,

External links
 Witness at the Internet off-Broadway Database

Plays by Terrence McNally
1968 plays
One-act plays